The 14th Johor State election was held on 9 May 2018, concurrently with the 2018 Malaysian general election. The previous state election was held on 5 May 2013. The state assemblymen is elected to 5 years term each.

The Johor State Legislative Assembly would automatically dissolve on 20 June 2018, the fifth anniversary of the first sitting, and elections must be held within sixty days (two months) of the dissolution (on or before 20 August 2018, with the date to be decided by the Election Commission), unless dissolved prior to that date by the Head of State (Sultan of Johor) on the advice of the Head of Government (Menteri Besar of Johor).

The results of the election saw a historic win for Pakatan Harapan (PH), winning 36 seats (a majority but 1 seat short of supermajority) and ousting Barisan Nasional from the state government, the first time since the first Johor state elections in 1955 that BN or its predecessor Alliance were defeated.
BERSATU's Osman Sapian was sworn in as Menteri Besar on 12 May 2018, while the state EXCO members were sworn in on 16 May 2018.

Contenders

Barisan Nasional (BN) is set to contest all 56 seats in Johor State Legislative Assembly. Barisan Nasional (BN) linchpin party United Malays National Organisation (UNMO) is to set to contest major share of Barisan Nasional (BN) seats.

Pakatan Harapan have decided to contest all 56 seats in Johor. Malaysian United Indigenous Party (Bersatu) will contest in 18 seats while the Democratic Action Party (DAP) will have 14 seats. People's Justice Party (PKR) and the National Trust Party (Amanah) will contest 12 seats each.

Pan-Malaysian Islamic Party (PAS) will compete for 40 seats.

Political parties

The contested seats

Election pendulum 
The 14th General Election witnessed 36 governmental seats and 20 non-governmental seats filled the Johor State Legislative Assembly. The government side has 12 safe seats and 7 fairly safe seats, while the non-government side has 4 safe seats and 3 fairly safe seats.

Results

Seats that changed allegiance

Aftermath
The results in Johor were seen as shocking to many, since the state was the birthplace of UMNO, and were viewed as 'fortress' with no defeats by BN or Alliance since 1955, the start of Johor state elections.

Osman only led the state government for 11 months, before resigning as Menteri Besar on April 2019. He were replaced by another BERSATU MLA, Sahruddin Jamal as Menteri Besar, who led the state government for another 11 months, until when in the wake of 2020 Malaysian political crisis and exit of BERSATU and most of its MLAs from PH resulted in Sahruddin resignation. A new state government formed under a coalition of BN and Perikatan Nasional (BERSATU and PAS), with BN's Hasni Mohammad sworn in as Menteri Besar on February 2020. That government, in turn lasted another 23 months until the death of Osman on December 2021 reduced the majority of the government into a minority government, and resulted in a snap election called by Hasni on January 2022 and took place on March 2022.

References

2018
2018 elections in Malaysia
May 2018 events in Malaysia